William Boyd, 4th Earl of Kilmarnock (12 May 170518 August 1746), was a Scottish peer who joined the 1745 Jacobite Rising, was captured at Culloden and subsequently executed for treason on Tower Hill.

His family were supporters of the government and Kilmarnock had not previously been involved with the Stuarts; he later stated "for the two Kings and their rights, I cared not a farthing which prevailed; but I was starving."

His title was declared forfeit and his heavily mortgaged estates confiscated; they were later returned to his eldest son James, later Earl of Erroll, who fought at Culloden on the government side.

Biography

William Boyd was born in 1705, only son of William Boyd, 3rd Earl of Kilmarnock (1683–1717) and Eupheme Ross (1684–1729). His father supported the government during the  1715 Jacobite Rising, but was deeply in debt when he died in 1717. Educated at the University of Glasgow, Kilmarnock reportedly had "an Aversion to rigorous Study of Letters" and was devoted to "Riding, Fencing, Dancing and Musick...esteemed by Men of Taste, a Polite gentleman."

In 1724 he married Lady Anne Livingston, only daughter of James Livingston, 5th Earl of Linlithgow, a Jacobite  attainted for his role in the 1715 Rising. Despite the loss of her family estates, Anne was considered an heiress; the Commission of Forfeited Estates found selling Jacobite property so complex and time-consuming that it was easier to come to an arrangement with the original owners. 

Many such properties were purchased through an 18th-century vulture fund called the York Buildings Company, which did a deal with Anne, who became financially secure as a result. She married Kilmarnock against her family's wishes; money and his lifestyle were constant issues and they lived together "civilly, if not happily". During the last year of his life he became the love interest of Viscountess Etheldreda Townshend, who briefly took an interest in becoming a Jacobite.

The Earl and the Countess lived at Dean Castle in Kilmarnock (Ayrshire), but when it was destroyed by fire in 1735 they could not afford the repairs and moved to Anne's home, Callendar House (in Falkirk), which remained in the family until 1783. The Earl's son James sold Dean Castle in 1746; while the outbuildings remained in use, the castle stood derelict until restored in the early-20th century.

Career
Kilmarnock's peerage gave him a seat in the House of Lords, where he voted as directed by Archibald Campbell, 3rd Duke of Argyll and Robert Walpole; he was paid a small pension for this, which ceased when Walpole lost power in 1742. He was Grand Master for the Masonic Grand Lodge of Scotland from 1742 to 1743, his successor being the Earl of Wemyss, whose son Lord Elcho also served in the Jacobite army; Murray of Broughton, later Secretary to Prince Charles, was also a member.

He first met Prince Charles during the 1745 Rebellion at Callendar House on 14 September. The decision to join the Jacobite army surprised many; it has been suggested one reason for doing so was pressure from his wife's family but he later told Argyll; "...I was starving, and...if Mahommed had set up his standard...I had been a good Mussulman for bread, for I must eat."

On 18 October, he received a commission in "Kilmarnock's Horse," which seems to have been composed largely of individual volunteers. One of the few Lowland peers to join the Rising, he quickly gained a prominent position with Charles, largely because he was unconnected to the group of long-term Jacobite Scots centred around Lord George Murray. Even before the invasion of England, there were deep divisions between Charles and his exile advisors on the one hand and the Scots on the other; after the retreat from Derby, the two groups viewed each other with suspicion and hostility. O'Sullivan later wrote "no man showed more respect for HRH (Charles)...", making Kilmarnock one of the few Scots who could be counted on to support Charles against his fellows.

When the main army entered England on 8 November, Viscount Strathallan remained in Perth; the Strathallan or Perthshire Horse was added to Kilmarnock's, a combined strength of about 130 men in all. They were chiefly engaged in reconnaissance duties and were the last to leave Carlisle on 21 December, before re-entering Scotland. In early January, the Jacobites besieged Stirling Castle; a government attempt to relieve it led to the Battle of Falkirk on 17 January.

The battle was fought near Callendar House, where Lady Anne was hosting Hawley, who used it as his headquarters; she allegedly detained him at dinner, to distract him from the battle. The Battle of Falkirk took place in failing light, during a fierce storm and amid considerable confusion. Although the cavalry was not involved, Kilmarnock's local knowledge was employed afterwards in locating the retreating government forces; on his return, he attacked a Cameron deserter from the government army, who was still in uniform and had to be rescued from his fellow clansmen.

Falkirk was a Jacobite tactical victory, but poor command and co-ordination deprived them of the last opportunity to decisively defeat their opponents. Many of the Highlanders who took part went home and when Cumberland resumed his advance on 30 January, Charles was told the army was in no state to fight. On 1 February 1746, the siege of Stirling was abandoned and the Jacobites withdrew to Inverness.

Kilmarnock's troop helped covered the retreat; at the end of this, their horses were in such poor condition that they were converted into infantry and retitled Foot Guards. The next two months were spent in Elgin, as part of Drummond's force guarding the line of the River Spey; the Jacobites were short of money and forced to requisition supplies from local merchants. 

When the campaigning season began in April, their leaders agreed the only option was a decisive victory; this led to Culloden, where they were defeated with heavy losses in less than an hour. James Boyd was in the government front line with the Royal Scots but Kilmarnock was with the Jacobite reserve and saw little action. The claim he was captured after mistaking government dragoons for his own troops is not supported by his own account; another anecdote recounts he lost his hat and wig and James gave him his own.

Trial and execution

Tried in London on 29 July, Kilmarnock, Lord Balmerino and the Earl of Cromartie were found guilty of treason and sentenced to death. This was commuted to beheading, rather than being hanged, drawn and quartered, as with Francis Towneley and others. It was expected one would be pardoned, but despite efforts by Kilmarnock's fellow Freemason, the Duke of Hamilton, this went to Cromartie, whose allegedly pregnant wife interceded with the Princess of Wales. Cromartie's father-in-law had been Private Secretary to the Prince of Wales and the writer Horace Walpole (1717-1792) later observed "Hamilton's intercession for Lord Kilmarnock hurried him to the block."

The sentences were carried out on Tower Hill on 18 August, Kilmarnock going first; shortly before, Balmerino contrived a meeting with him to discuss the "No quarter" order. Allegedly issued by the Jacobite leadership before Culloden and used to justify the harsh government response, its existence is extremely dubious. However, Balmerino ensured Kilmarnock confirmed before witnesses that if such an order did exist, the blame lay with Lord George Murray, not the Prince, a version later published in the official trial records. Even on the verge of death, the internal divisions that undermined the Jacobite cause continued.

Kilmarnock complied with the convention prisoners facing death express contrition and acceptance of the justice of their sentence. He confirmed George II was the "true and legitimate sovereign", wrote letters to his sons and wife and asked for help in settling his debts. Following his execution, he was buried in St Peter ad Vincula, the church attached to the Tower of London.

Lady Anne outlived him by a year, dying in September 1747. She is honoured with a mural in St Marnock Square, Kilmarnock.

Ancestry

Notes

References

Sources
 
 
 
 
 
 * 
 
 
 
 
 

Earls of Kilmarnock
Boyd, William, 4th Earl of Kilmarnock
Boyd, William, 4th Earl of Kilmarnock
Jacobite military personnel of the Jacobite rising of 1745
Executions at the Tower of London
Scottish Jacobites
Executed Scottish people
People executed by the Kingdom of Great Britain
Alumni of the University of Glasgow
Scottish Freemasons
People from Kilmarnock